Godwin Diogo Franco (16 February 1985) is an Indian professional footballer.

Early life
Godwin Diogo Franco comes from the Parish of Saint Diogo's (Saint Didacus) Catholic Church, Goa.

He played academy football from 2001–2003. He played in the then U-19 National Football League in 2001 and in the then U-19 National Football League in 2003.

Club career

2003-2005
He started his professional career in 2003. He played for two seasons, winning the Goa Governors Cup with them. He played in the National Football League, the top tier football league of India. He played in the Indian Federation Cup.

2005-2006
He played in the National Football League. He played in the Indian Federation Cup.

2006-2009
Godwin won the Goa Professional League and G.F.A. Charity Cup. He played in the Indian Federation Cup. During this time Godwin sustained a major injury in a road accident in 2007 after which he returned in 2009.

2009-2010
Godwin finished 3rd in the  I-league, starting 23 times in the midfield. He played in the Indian Federation Cup.

2010-2014

Godwin won 9 trophies including the I-League and the Indian Super Cup 1997–2011. He finished runner up in the  2012 Indian Federation Cup, in which he made an assist for a goal in the final. He played in the 2011 AFC Champions League qualifier. Godwin started in a match that created an all-time record for the highest goals scored by a team in a single match in any of the top tier Indian league football matches, with a 14-0 home win in the I-League. He completed his part in that match with a 100% pass ratio.

2013

Godwin was selected along with fellow Indian player Nirmal Chettri by former German Bundesliga champions Fortuna Düsseldorf, for a trial in November 2013.

2014
Godwin finished 2nd place in the 1st Indian Super League.

2015
After the first five matches of the I League, Godwin started every match scoring two long range goals, finishing 3rd in the I League.

2015
Godwin won the 2015 Indian Super League final in his home state Goa.

C. D. Guadalupe
On 11 March 2018, Godwin made his debut for Costa Rican side Club Deportivo Guadalupe in the Liga Promérica. He was making a comeback from another major injury from a road accident soon after the 2015 Indian Super League final. He was to sign on loan for the 2016 I-League, but he met with a road accident on the day he did his medical tests for the club.  Godwin played for C.D. Guadalupe in 9 matches, qualifying for the first division of that league system. He played in 9 matches, scoring 2 goals from open play and 1 goal from a penalty shoot out.

International career
Godwin played for India in the 2006 at the Lusophony Games in Macau, representing the Indian Olympic Association. Godwin played for the India under-19 team in 2003. Godwin was part of the India national football team camp for the 2010 AFC Challenge Cup. He could not play because of late  registration. Godwin was selected as a probable for the India national football team for the 2018 World Cup qualifiers. He was also a part of the India national football team preliminary squad for the 2019 AFC Asian Cup qualifiers.

Godwin played for the U-16, U-19 and U-21 Goa state football teams at National Championships for his state Goa. He captained Goa at the U-21 level. Godwin played for the Goa football team for the National Championship tournament. He was the semi-finalist of the National Championship tournament. Godwin played for the Goa state team vs the Zambia national football team in an invitational match in Goa.

Honours

Club
2003-2005
Goa Governors Cup: Winner
2006-2009
Goa Professional League 2006-2007 Winner
GFA Charity Cup: Winner 2006 
2010-2014.
I League 2011–12 Winner 
 Indian Super Cup 2010 Winner 
Goa Professional League (2): 2010-2011 Winner, 2011-2012 Winner
Goa Super League: 2011-2012 Winner
Goa Super Cup: 2011-2012 Winner 
GFA Knock Out Cup: 2011-2012 Winner
GFA Charity Cup (3): 2010 Winner, 2011 Winner, 2012 Winner
Indian Federation Cup 2012 Runner Up
AFC Champions League 2011 Qualifier
AFC Cup 2011 Pre Quarter Finalist
2014
Indian Super League 2014 Runner Up

2015
Indian Super League 2015 Winner

Guadalupe 
Qualified for 1st Division of a football league in Costa Rica

See also
 List of Indian football players in foreign leagues

References

External links

1985 births
Living people
Footballers from Goa
Dempo SC players
I-League players
Pune FC players
Sporting Clube de Goa players
Churchill Brothers FC Goa players
Kerala Blasters FC players
Kerala Blasters FC draft picks
Indian Super League players
Royal Wahingdoh FC players
India youth international footballers
Association football midfielders
Indian footballers
Indian expatriate footballers
Chennaiyin FC players